Korora oliveri, also referred to as Oliver's penguin, is a genus and species of extinct penguin from the Waitakian Stage (Late Oligocene to Early Miocene) of New Zealand. It was relatively small and slender, similar in size to one of the larger crested penguins. The penguin was described by Brian Marples in 1952 from fossil material (a tarsometatarsus) he collected in the Hakataramea Valley, in the Canterbury region of the South Island. The genus name Korora is the Māori term for the extant little penguin. The specific epithet honours Walter Oliver (1883–1957) a former director of the Dominion Museum.

References

Fossil taxa described in 1952
Birds described in 1952
Spheniscidae
Oligocene birds
Miocene birds
Extinct birds of New Zealand
Extinct monotypic bird genera
Prehistoric bird genera
Extinct penguins
Taxa named by Brian John Marples